is a railway station on the Tohoku Shinkansen in Shichinohe, Aomori, Japan, operated by the East Japan Railway Company (JR East). It opened on 4 December 2010.

Lines

Station layout
The station consists of two side platforms serving two tracks, with no passing tracks. The platforms are 263 m long and capable of handling 10-car trains. A track maintenance depot is located north of the station, with the connecting turnouts covered by a large snow shelter.

Platforms

Some trains pass this station.

History

Construction of the new station started in August 2008, with completion scheduled for September 2009.

Initially named provisionally as Shichinohe Station, the name of the new station was announced on 29 July 2009, to emphasize the station's role as a gateway to Lake Towada.

Passenger statistics
In fiscal 2011, the station was used by an average of 497 passengers daily (boarding passengers only).

The passenger figures for previous years are as shown below.

Bus terminal

Highway buses 
 Sirius; For Ikebukuro Station and Tokyo Station
 Enburi; For Shinjuku Station and Tokyo Station

See also
 List of railway stations in Japan

References

External links

 JR East station information 

Railway stations in Aomori Prefecture
Railway stations in Japan opened in 2010